Jasminanthes is a plant genus in the family Apocynaceae, first described as a genus in 1850. It is native to China, Laos, Thailand and Vietnam.

Species

 Jasminanthes chunii (Tsiang) W.D. Stevens & P.T. Li - Guangdong, Guangxi, Hunan
Jasminanthes laotica Y.H. Tan & H.B. Ding - Laos
 Jasminanthes mucronata (Blanco) W.D. Stevens & P.T. Li - Fujian, Guangdong, Guangxi, Guizhou, Hunan, Sichuan, Taiwan, Zhejiang
 Jasminanthes pilosa (Kerr) W.D. Stevens & P.T. Li - Guangxi, Yunnan, Thailand, Vietnam 
 Jasminanthes saxatilis (Tsiang & P.T. Li) W.D. Stevens & P.T. Li - Guangxi, Yunnan
Jasminanthes tuyetanhiae T.B.Tran & Rodda - Vietnam
Jasminanthes xuanlienensis T.B Tran & Rodda - Vietnam

formerly included
transferred to Stephanotis 
Jasminanthes suaveolens Blume is now a synonym of  Stephanotis suaveolens (Blume) Benth. & Hook. f. ex K. Schum.

References

External links

Asclepiadoideae
Apocynaceae genera